Hlukhivtsi is an urban-type settlement in Khmilnyk Raion of Vinnytsia Oblast in Ukraine. Hlukhivtsi hosts the administration of Hlukhivtsi settlement hromada, one of the hromadas of Ukraine. Population: 

Until 18 July 2020, Hlukhivtsi belonged to Koziatyn Raion. The raion was abolished in July 2020 as part of the administrative reform of Ukraine, which reduced the number of raions of Vinnytsia Oblast to six. The area of Koziatyn Raion was merged into Khmilnyk Raion.

Economy

Transportation
Kaolinova railway station is located in the settlement, on the railway connecting Berdychiv and Koziatyn. There is infrequent passenger traffic.

The settlement has access to Highway M21 which connects Vinnytsia and Zhytomyr.

References

Urban-type settlements in Khmilnyk Raion